Stone Corral Creek is a watercourse in Colusa County, California. It has a drainage area of 38.2 square miles. The stream flows past the communities of Sites and Maxwell.

References

Rivers of Colusa County, California
Tributaries of the Sacramento River
Geography of the Sacramento Valley